TruVista is an American company that provides broadband Internet, long-distance telephone, and cable TV services to customers in the South Carolina counties of Chester County, Fairfield County, Kershaw County and a small portion of Richland County. Truvista Communications Offers Basic, Standard, and Digital Cable to Customers. In May 2012, TruVista bought cable systems serving Franklin, Hart, Rabun and Stephens counties in Georgia from Northland Communications, a Seattle, WA based company, and Depot Street Communications, a GA based company. The first acquisition outside South Carolina.

Service areas
TruVista has offices in the following service areas:

 South Carolina: Chester, Camden, Great Falls, Lockhart, Ridgeway, Winnsboro
 Georgia: Stephens, Franklin, Rabun, Hart Counties

References

External links 
 

Cable television companies of the United States
Telecommunications companies of the United States